Eric Vasquez (born November 18, 1982 in Miami, Florida) is an American soccer player, who last played as a midfielder for Miami FC.

Vasquez played college soccer at the University of Central Florida from 2001 to 2003.  He was twice named to the All Atlantic Sun First Team and in 2003 a Second Team All American. He also played with the PDL League's Central Florida Kraze.

He was drafted in the second round, 20th overall, by the Columbus Crew in the 2005 MLS Supplemental Draft.  Following the 2006 season, Vasquez was waived by the Crew.
2007 Saw Vasquez join the USL-1 Miami FC. There, he was the leading scorer for the team.  In the fall of 2007, he signed with the Orlando Sharks of the Major Indoor Soccer League. He later finished the 2008 season with USL-1 Miami FC. where he played the season under recent knee surgery. After the season according to official Miami FC statements he retired due to microfracture knee surgery.

Vasquez is currently a director for the Miami Breakers FC youth academy.

Honors

Central Florida Kraze
USL Premier Development League Champions (1): 2004

References

External links

Profile at uslsoccer.com

1982 births
Living people
American soccer players
Columbus Crew players
Orlando City U-23 players
Miami FC (2006) players
Major Indoor Soccer League (2001–2008) players
Orlando Sharks players
USL First Division players
USL League Two players
Major League Soccer players
Soccer players from Miami
UCF Knights men's soccer players
Columbus Crew draft picks
Association football midfielders